Enrique Narvay (born 26 January 1990 in Mar del Plata (Buenos Aires), Argentina) is an Argentine footballer currently playing for Sport Huancayo of the Primera División in Peru.

Teams
  Quilmes 2009–2011
  San Martín de Mendoza 2011
  Rivadavia de Lincoln 2012
  Sportivo Carapeguá 2011–2013
  Sport Huancayo 2014–present.

References
 
 

1990 births
Living people
Argentine footballers
Argentine expatriate footballers
San Martín de Mendoza footballers
Quilmes Atlético Club footballers
Sportivo Carapeguá footballers
Argentine Primera División players
Expatriate footballers in Paraguay
Association footballers not categorized by position
Sportspeople from Mar del Plata